Clifton Emmett Cushman (June 2, 1938 – September 25, 1966) was an American athlete who competed mainly in the 400 metre hurdles.

He competed for the United States in the 1960 Summer Olympics held in Rome, Italy in the 400 metre hurdles where he won the silver medal.

High school
Cushman was a graduate of Grand Forks Central High School in Grand Forks, North Dakota in 1956. Cushman was an outstanding athlete while running track for the Redskins, breaking and setting many records. In 1990 Cushman was inducted into the Grand Forks Central Athletic Hall of Fame.  Randy Heuther of Lisbon High School, ND broke Cushman's record in the hurdles, but then was stripped of the title after a wind-aided controversy.

College

After high school, Cushman attended the University of Kansas where he again broke and set many track records. In 1959, he took second place in the 400-meter hurdles providing Kansas with their back bone to reach their first NCAA Championship. In the next year he was named captain of the Jayhawks, in this same season he also earned most outstanding performer honors at the Kansas Relays, as well as winning the national title in the 400 meter hurdles. Again helping to provide the Jayhawks with that back bone needed to defend the NCAA Championship.

His biggest achievement during his college career was during the 1960 season where Cliff Cushman became an Olympian, competing in the 1960 games in Rome. Cushman finished second overall with a time  of 49.6 seconds in the 400 meter hurdles.

Race to the gold medal

In 1964 Cliff Cushman hoped to compete again in the Olympics. However, his hopes of winning a medal were lost when he stumbled over a hurdle at the final U.S. Olympic trial meet in Los Angeles.

Just hours after the meet, Cushman wrote a letter to the youth of his hometown of Grand Forks asking them to not feel sorry for him but instead to set goals for themselves.

U.S. Air Force
After Cushman's successful career at the University of Kansas, he joined the United States Air Force. His last posting before being sent to Vietnam was at Payne Field just south of Everett, Washington.

Death
Cushman's call sign was "Devil 2." The flight arrived in the target area on schedule and immediately checked in with the airborne battlefield command and control center (ABCCC). Devil flight was directed to begin their bomb runs on the bridge.

At 15:30 hours, Devil Lead made his pass on the target followed in order by the rest of his flight. After pulling off the target, Cushman radioed that he had been hit by anti-aircraft artillery (AAA) fire and he had a fire warning light. Devil 3 asked if he could steer, Cushman replied he had "lost his stability, augmentation and aircraft power."

Devil Lead observed 37 mm AAA fire bursting to the left and rear of Devil 2 (Cushman), and told Cushman to break right. Lead then saw his afterburner light and simultaneous torch of flames coming from the right aft section of Devil 2 (Cushman)'s aircraft. Devil Lead then observed Cushman's aircraft break into several burning parts. He also saw Cushman's ejection seat arcing up and to the front of the falling wreckage. They could not find his body anywhere. Because of the rough landscape it was nearly impossible for anyone to gain radio control. Cushman was immediately listed Missing in Action, this was later changed to presumptive finding of death.

On November 6, 1975, Cushman was officially declared dead.

Surviving family members were spouse Carolyn Cushman and son Colin Cushman.

Memorials
Grand Forks Central High School and Red River High School named the football stadium they share after him, Cushman Field. Every fall, the football game between the two schools is called the Cushman Classic. His picture is displayed in GFC's gymnasium, and his name is mentioned in almost every Hall of Fame cabinet. 

His wife said after being informed of her husband's status: "Somewhere in Vietnam he's running the biggest race of his life. It's like watching a race in which Cliff is running - only you can't see the finish tape. He's in excellent physical condition. Cliff also has a very deep faith in God. What better combination could there be?"

References

Links

Defense Prisoner of War/Missing Personnel Office -- Additional case details on CUSHMAN, CLIFTON EMMET from the US Government database on Personnel Missing in Southeast Asia -- Vietnam War

American male hurdlers
Olympic silver medalists for the United States in track and field
Athletes (track and field) at the 1959 Pan American Games
Pan American Games bronze medalists for the United States
Athletes (track and field) at the 1960 Summer Olympics
1938 births
1966 deaths
Kansas Jayhawks men's track and field athletes
Sportspeople from Grand Forks, North Dakota
Track and field athletes from North Dakota
United States Air Force officers
Aerial disappearances of military personnel in action
American military personnel killed in the Vietnam War
Pan American Games medalists in athletics (track and field)
Place of birth missing
Place of death missing
Medalists at the 1960 Summer Olympics
Medalists at the 1959 Pan American Games
United States Air Force personnel of the Vietnam War
American Vietnam War pilots
Olympians killed in warfare